The toros or brush-tailed rats, genus Isothrix, are a group of spiny rats found in tropical South America, particularly in the Amazon Basin.

Description
Toros look like large rats with soft fur on the body and long guard hairs on the scaly tail.  Head and body is 18-27.5 cm and tail is 17–30 cm. Weight is 320-570 grams.

Natural history
These animals appear to be arboreal, based on the shape of their hind feet. They are thought to spend the day in holes in the ground near trees.

Systematics

There are currently five species recognized in the genus Isothrix:
 Isothrix barbarabrownae- Barbara Brown's Brush-tailed Rat
 Isothrix bistriata - Yellow-crowned brush-tailed rat
 Isothrix negrensis - Rio Negro brush-tailed rat
 Isothrix pagurus - Plain brush-tailed rat
 Isothrix sinnamariensis - Sinnamary brush-tailed rat

There does appear to be good support for the monophyly of three species found in this genus.

Phylogeny

Isothrix is a member of the Echimyini clade of arboreal Echimyidae rodents. Although tentatively considered an echimyine, it has been suggested that Isothrix may not be particularly closely related to other members of its subfamily. This is confirmed by molecular phylogenies in which Isothrix appears as a distant relative of the three clades of Echimyini: (i) Echimys, Phyllomys, Makalata, Pattonomys, and Toromys ; (ii) the bamboo rats Dactylomys, Olallamys, Kannabateomys together with Diplomys and Santamartamys ; and (iii) the arboreal eumysopines Mesomys and Lonchothrix.

The taxon Callistomys pictus was previously member of the genus Isothrix, but most authors considered it distinct enough to warrant a separate genus. This distinctness has been confirmed by DNA comparative studies in which Callistomys even appears to branch with members of a distinct tribe (i.e., Myocastorini) of the subfamily Echimyinae. The arboreal genera of the subfamily Echimyinae therefore constitute a polyphyletic assemblage.

References

 
Rodent genera
Taxa named by Johann Andreas Wagner